René Gillard (born 11 November 1920, date of death unknown) was a Belgian footballer. He played in six matches for the Belgium national football team in 1949.

References

External links
 

1920 births
Year of death missing
Belgian footballers
Belgium international footballers
Place of birth missing
Association footballers not categorized by position